In quantum statistics, Bose–Einstein statistics (B–E statistics) describes one of two possible ways in which a collection of non-interacting, indistinguishable particles may occupy a set of available discrete energy states at thermodynamic equilibrium. The aggregation of particles in the same state, which is a characteristic of particles obeying Bose–Einstein statistics, accounts for the cohesive streaming of laser light and the frictionless creeping of superfluid helium. The theory of this behaviour was developed (1924–25) by Satyendra Nath Bose, who recognized that a collection of identical and indistinguishable particles can be distributed in this way. The idea was later adopted and extended by Albert Einstein in collaboration with Bose.

The Bose–Einstein statistics applies only to the particles not limited to single occupancy of the same state – that is, particles that do not obey the Pauli exclusion principle restrictions. Such particles have integer values of spin and are named bosons. Particles with half-integer spins are called fermions and obey Fermi-Dirac statistics.

Bose–Einstein distribution
At low temperatures, bosons behave differently from fermions (which obey the Fermi–Dirac statistics) in a way that an unlimited number of them can "condense" into the same energy state. This apparently unusual property also gives rise to the special state of matter – the Bose–Einstein condensate. Fermi–Dirac and Bose–Einstein statistics apply when quantum effects are important and the particles are "indistinguishable". Quantum effects appear if the concentration of particles satisfies

Fermi–Dirac statistics applies to fermions (particles that obey the Pauli exclusion principle), and Bose–Einstein statistics applies to bosons. As the quantum concentration depends on temperature, most systems at high temperatures obey the classical (Maxwell–Boltzmann) limit, unless they also have a very high density, as for a white dwarf. Both Fermi–Dirac and Bose–Einstein become Maxwell–Boltzmann statistics at high temperature or at low concentration.

B–E statistics was introduced for photons in 1924 by Bose and generalized to atoms by Einstein in 1924–25.

The expected number of particles in an energy state  for B–E statistics is:

The variance of this distribution  is calculated directly from the expression above for the average number.

For comparison, the average number of fermions with energy  given by Fermi–Dirac particle-energy distribution has a similar form:

As mentioned above, both the Bose–Einstein distribution and the Fermi–Dirac distribution approaches the Maxwell–Boltzmann distribution in the limit of high temperature and low particle density, without the need for any ad hoc assumptions:

 In the limit of low particle density, therefore  or equivalently . In that case, which is the result from Maxwell–Boltzmann statistics.
 In the limit of high temperature, the particles are distributed over a large range of energy values, therefore the occupancy on each state (especially the high energy ones with ) is again very small, . This again reduces to Maxwell–Boltzmann statistics.

History
Władysław Natanson in 1911 concluded that Planck's law requires indistinguishability of "units of energy", although he did not frame this in terms of Einstein's light quanta.

While presenting a lecture at the University of Dhaka (in what was then British India and is now Bangladesh) on the theory of radiation and the ultraviolet catastrophe, Satyendra Nath Bose intended to show his students that the contemporary theory was inadequate, because it predicted results not in accordance with experimental results. During this lecture, Bose committed an error in applying the theory, which unexpectedly gave a prediction that agreed with the experiment. The error was a simple mistake—similar to arguing that flipping two fair coins will produce two heads one-third of the time—that would appear obviously wrong to anyone with a basic understanding of statistics (remarkably, this error resembled the famous blunder by d'Alembert known from his Croix ou Pile article). However, the results it predicted agreed with experiment, and Bose realized it might not be a mistake after all. For the first time, he took the position that the Maxwell–Boltzmann distribution would not be true for all microscopic particles at all scales. Thus, he studied the probability of finding particles in various states in phase space, where each state is a little patch having phase volume of h3, and the position and momentum of the particles are not kept particularly separate but are considered as one variable.

Bose adapted this lecture into a short article called "Planck's law and the hypothesis of light quanta" and submitted it to the Philosophical Magazine. However, the referee's report was negative, and the paper was rejected. Einstein immediately agreed, personally translated the article from English into German (Bose had earlier translated Einstein's article on the general theory of relativity from German to English), and saw to it that it was published. The paper came out in 1924.

The reason Bose produced accurate results was that since photons are indistinguishable from each other, one cannot treat any two photons having equal quantum numbers (e.g., polarization and momentum vector) as being two distinct identifiable photons. By analogy, if in an alternate universe coins were to behave like photons and other bosons, the probability of producing two heads would indeed be one-third, and so is the probability of getting a head and a tail which equals one-half for the conventional (classical, distinguishable) coins. Bose's "error" leads to what is now called Bose–Einstein statistics.

Bose and Einstein extended the idea to atoms and this led to the prediction of the existence of phenomena which became known as Bose–Einstein condensate, a dense collection of bosons (which are particles with integer spin, named after Bose), which was demonstrated to exist by experiment in 1995.

Derivation

Derivation from the microcanonical ensemble 
In the microcanonical ensemble, one considers a system with fixed energy, volume, and number of particles. We take a system composed of  identical bosons,  of which have energy  and are distributed over  levels or states with the same energy , i.e.  is the degeneracy associated with energy  of total energy . Calculation of the number of arrangements of  particles distributed among  states is a problem of combinatorics. Since particles are indistinguishable in the quantum mechanical context here, the number of ways for arranging  particles in  boxes (for the th energy level) would be (see image).

where  is the k-combination of a set with m elements.

The maximum number of arrangements determining the corresponding occupation number  is obtained by maximizing the entropy, or equivalently, setting  and taking the subsidiary conditions  into account (as Lagrange multipliers).

Derivation from the grand canonical ensemble 
The Bose–Einstein distribution, which applies only to a quantum system of non-interacting bosons, is naturally derived from the grand canonical ensemble without any approximations. In this ensemble, the system is able to exchange energy and exchange particles with a reservoir (temperature T and chemical potential µ fixed by the reservoir).

Due to the non-interacting quality, each available single-particle level (with energy level ϵ) forms a separate thermodynamic system in contact with the reservoir. That is, the number of particles within the overall system that occupy a given single particle state form a sub-ensemble that is also grand canonical ensemble; hence, it may be analysed through the construction of a grand partition function.

Every single-particle state is of a fixed energy, . As the sub-ensemble associated with a single-particle state varies by the number of particles only, it is clear that the total energy of the sub-ensemble is also directly proportional to the number of particles in the single-particle state; where  is the number of particles, the total energy of the sub-ensemble will then be .

This formula applies to fermionic systems as well as bosonic systems. Fermi–Dirac statistics arises when considering the effect of the Pauli exclusion principle: whilst the number of fermions occupying the same single-particle state can only be either 1 or 0, the number of bosons occupying a single particle state may be any integer. Thus, the grand partition function for bosons can be considered a geometric series and may be evaluated as such:

Note that the geometric series is convergent only if , including the case where . This implies that the chemical potential for the Bose gas must be negative, i.e., whereas the Fermi gas is allowed to take both positive and negative values for the chemical potential.

The average particle number for that single-particle substate is given by

This result applies for each single-particle level and thus forms the Bose–Einstein distribution for the entire state of the system.

The variance in particle number, is:

As a result, for highly occupied states the standard deviation of the particle number of an energy level is very large, slightly larger than the particle number itself: . This large uncertainty is due to the fact that the probability distribution for the number of bosons in a given energy level is a geometric distribution; somewhat counterintuitively, the most probable value for N is always 0.

Derivation in the canonical approach 

It is also possible to derive approximate Bose–Einstein statistics in the canonical ensemble. These derivations are lengthy and only yield the above results in the asymptotic limit of a large number of particles. The reason is that the total number of bosons is fixed in the canonical ensemble. The Bose–Einstein distribution in this case can be derived as in most texts by maximization, but the mathematically best derivation is by the Darwin–Fowler method of mean values as emphasized by Dingle. See also Müller-Kirsten. The fluctuations of the ground state in the condensed region are however markedly different in the canonical and grand-canonical ensembles.

Suppose we have a number of energy levels, labeled by index , each level having energy  and containing a total of  particles.  Suppose each level contains  distinct sublevels, all of which have the same energy, and which are distinguishable. For example, two particles may have different momenta, in which case they are distinguishable from each other, yet they can still have the same energy. 
The value of  
 associated with level  is called the "degeneracy" of that energy level. Any number of bosons can occupy the same sublevel.

Let  be the number of ways of distributing  particles among the  sublevels of an energy level. There is only one way of distributing  particles with one sublevel, therefore . It is easy to see that there are  ways of distributing  particles in two sublevels which we will write as:

With a little thought (see Notes below) it can be seen that the number of ways of distributing  particles in three sublevels is

so that

where we have used the following theorem involving binomial coefficients:

Continuing this process, we can see that  is just a binomial coefficient
(See Notes below)

For example, the population numbers for two particles in three sublevels are 200, 110, 101, 020, 011, or 002 for a total of six which equals 4!/(2!2!). The number of ways that a set of occupation numbers  can be realized is the product of the ways that each individual energy level can be populated:

where the approximation assumes that .

We constrain our solution using Lagrange multipliers forming the function:

Using the  approximation and using Stirling's approximation for the factorials  gives

By a process similar to that outlined in the Maxwell–Boltzmann statistics article, it can be seen that:

which, using Boltzmann's famous relationship  becomes a statement of the second law of thermodynamics at constant volume, and it follows that  and  where S is the entropy,  is the chemical potential, kB is Boltzmann's constant and T is the temperature, so that finally:

Note that the above formula is sometimes written:

where  is the absolute activity, as noted by McQuarrie.

Also note that when the particle numbers are not conserved, removing the conservation of particle numbers constraint is equivalent to setting  and therefore the chemical potential  to zero. This will be the case for photons and massive particles in mutual equilibrium and the resulting distribution will be the Planck distribution.

A much simpler way to think of Bose–Einstein distribution function is to consider that n particles are denoted by identical balls and g shells are marked by g-1 line partitions. It is clear that the permutations of these n balls and g − 1 partitions will give different ways of arranging bosons in different energy levels. Say, for 3 (= n) particles and 3 (= g) shells, therefore , the arrangement might be |●●|●, or ||●●●, or |●|●● , etc. Hence the number of distinct permutations of  objects which have n identical items and (g − 1) identical items will be:

See the image for a visual representation of one such distribution of n particles in g boxes that can be represented as  partitions. 

OR

The purpose of these notes is to clarify some aspects of the derivation of the Bose–Einstein (B–E) distribution for beginners. The enumeration of cases (or ways) in the B–E distribution can be recast as follows. Thus a valid sequence of die throws can be described by an n-tuple , such that . Let  denote the set of these valid n-tuples:

Example n = 4, g = 3:

 (there are  elements in )

The construction of subsets  and  follows in the same manner.

Each element of  can be thought of as a multiset of cardinality ; the elements of such multiset are taken from the set  of cardinality , and the number of such multisets is the multiset coefficient

To understand the decomposition

or for example,  and 

We write

Similarly, it is easy to see that

Thus we can write 

or more generally,

and since the sets 

are non-intersecting, we thus have

with the convention that

Continuing the process, we arrive at the following formula

Using the convention (7)2 above, we obtain the formula

Interdisciplinary applications

Viewed as a pure probability distribution, the Bose–Einstein distribution has found application in other fields:

 In recent years, Bose–Einstein statistics has also been used as a method for term weighting in information retrieval. The method is one of a collection of DFR ("Divergence From Randomness") models, the basic notion being that Bose–Einstein statistics may be a useful indicator in cases where a particular term and a particular document have a significant relationship that would not have occurred purely by chance. Source code for implementing this model is available from the Terrier project at the University of Glasgow.
 The evolution of many complex systems, including the World Wide Web, business, and citation networks, is encoded in the dynamic web describing the interactions between the system's constituents. Despite their irreversible and nonequilibrium nature these networks follow Bose statistics and can undergo Bose–Einstein condensation. Addressing the dynamical properties of these nonequilibrium systems within the framework of equilibrium quantum gases predicts that the "first-mover-advantage", "fit-get-rich" (FGR) and "winner-takes-all" phenomena observed in competitive systems are thermodynamically distinct phases of the underlying evolving networks.

See also
 Bose–Einstein correlations
 Bose–Einstein condensate
 Bose gas
 Einstein solid
 Higgs boson
 Parastatistics
 Planck's law of black body radiation
 Superconductivity
 Fermi–Dirac statistics
 Maxwell–Boltzmann statistics

Notes

References

 
Concepts in physics
Quantum field theory
Albert Einstein
Statistical mechanics
Satyendra Nath Bose